In a number of small communities in Northern Ontario without cable service, TVOntario also operates LPTV transmitters which broadcast the network as a conventional over-the-air signal. These transmitters broadcast with the call sign CJOL-TV. See list of CJOL-TV and CIOL-TV Ontario Parliament Network transmitters.

Transmitters located in First Nations communities in the region also leased time to the Wawatay Native Communications Society to broadcast aboriginal-themed programming.

In April 2012, TVOntario announced that it would be decommissioning all of its remaining analog transmitters and associated towers by October 2013 including towers that it owns, which would impact the Ontario Parliament Network, as it shares towers with TVOntario.  As of December 2012, the Ontario Parliament Network only has 10 remaining over-the-air transmitters, according to Industry Canada's TV spectrum database.  Previously, there had been 32 transmitters with the call sign of CJOL-TV.

As of 2015, it is uncertain if any of these remaining analog transmitters are still in operation.

References

External links
 Legislative Assembly of Ontario
 TV Database Online Ontario - CJOL-TV - w9wi.com

TVO
Legislative Assembly of Ontario
Canadian television-related lists